Chaetorellia hestia is a species of tephritid or fruit flies in the genus Chaetorellia of the family Tephritidae.

Distribution
France & Spain, Italy, Algeria.

References

Tephritinae
Insects described in 1937
Diptera of Europe